Hermann Tunner (17 May 1913 – 25 August 1985) was an Austrian athlete. He competed in the men's discus throw at the 1948 Summer Olympics.

References

External links
 

1913 births
1985 deaths
Athletes (track and field) at the 1948 Summer Olympics
Austrian male discus throwers
Olympic athletes of Austria
Place of birth missing